Etesiolaus kyabobo, the Kyabobo green sapphire, is a butterfly in the family Lycaenidae. It is found in Guinea, Ivory Coast, Ghana (the Volta Region), the Central African Republic and the eastern part of the Democratic Republic of the Congo. The habitat consists of dry, semi-deciduous forests.

Adults have been recorded in January and May.

References

Butterflies described in 1996
Iolaini